The Thirteenth Oklahoma Legislature was a meeting of the legislative branch of the government of Oklahoma, composed of the Oklahoma Senate and the Oklahoma House of Representatives. The state legislature met in Oklahoma City, in regular session from January 6 to April 11, 1931, during the term of Governor William H. Murray. Murray, a former House speaker, helped Wilburton editor Carlton Weaver become Speaker; both were members of the constitutional convention. Despite his political maneuvering, the governor found opposition to many of his proposals. The session marked the first instance that redistricting was done outside of constitutional requirements.

Dates of sessions
Regular session: January 6-April 11, 1931
Previous: 12th Legislature • Next: 14th Legislature

Party composition

Senate

Oklahoma House of Representatives

Major legislation
Taxes - House Bill 1 created the Oklahoma Tax Commission.

Leadership
With the governor's help, Wilburton editor and one of the youngest members of Oklahoma's constitutional convention Carlton Weaver was elected Speaker of the Oklahoma House of Representatives. House Majority Floor Leader J.T. Daniel was resistant to some of the governor's proposals. W.G. Stigler served as President pro tempore of the Oklahoma Senate.

Members

Senate

Table based on state almanac and list of all senators.

House of Representatives

Table based on government database.

References

External links
Oklahoma Legislature
Oklahoma House of Representatives
Oklahoma Senate

Oklahoma legislative sessions
1931 in Oklahoma
1932 in Oklahoma
1931 U.S. legislative sessions
1932 U.S. legislative sessions